Mohamed Fahd Al-Bishi (born 1 September 1965) is a Saudi Arabian sprinter. He competed in the men's 100 metres at the 1988 Summer Olympics.

References

1965 births
Living people
Athletes (track and field) at the 1988 Summer Olympics
Saudi Arabian male sprinters
Olympic athletes of Saudi Arabia
Place of birth missing (living people)